Relations between Austria and Germany are specially close due to their shared history, culture, and language; with Germans being the main ethnic group and German being the official language of both countries.

Ancestors of Austrians were the Germanic Baiuvarii/Bavarii (ancient German Bavarians) but not another people or other peoples, the Baiuvarii came from present-day southeast Germany in the north/Germania and moved to present-day Austria in the Migration period after successful Germanic invasions of ancient Rome when Germanic peoples came from the north i.e. Germania to end the Roman Empire in 476, there were other Germanic peoples and non-Germanic peoples owned their lands in present-day Austria in the early history but the Baiuvarii established the Duchy of Bavaria and territory of future Austrian state was also part of the Duchy of Bavaria. From 788 to 843; Bavaria including present-day Austria was part of Francia a state established by the Franks, a West Germanic people. Later Austria under Bavarian rule was also a part of East Francia (Kingdom of Germany) from 843 to 972 then separated from the Duchy of Bavaria as a state in 972, Austria and other German states formed part of the German Holy Roman Empire led by Austria itself from 972 to 1806 and the German Confederation also led by Austria from 1815 to 1866; so in 1866 Austria was firstly separated from Germany and German Confederation was dissolved. In 1867 Austro-Hungarian Empire was established for Austria while in 1866 and 1871 North German Confederation and German Empire led by the Kingdom of Prussia rivals of Austria were established respectively for Germany; in military, Austria (Austria-Hungary) and Germany (German Empire) were allies of each other at the time.

In 1918, after the end of World War I and with the fall of Austria-Hungary and German Empire, Austria briefly renamed itself the Republic of German-Austria in a bid for union with Germany; an action forbidden by the Treaty of Saint-Germain-en-Laye (1919) created by the winners of World War I against both Germany and Austria and as a result; throughout much of the Interwar period, Austria and Germany continued to remain as separate and distinct entities.

However, in 1938, the revanchist Nazi Germany led by Austrian-born Adolf Hitler annexed Austria into Germany in what would come to be called the Anschluss. Following the fact that Austria under Allied control claimed independence to be secondly separated from Germany on 27 April 1945, the German identity in Austria has been weakened. The 1955 Austrian State Treaty to let Austria gain power from the Allied occupying the country also banned the reunification of Germany and Austria. The first victim theory was very popular in Austria from its start in 1949 to 1988 that Austria was the first victim of Nazi Germany and therefore had nothing to do with the Nazi German crimes, but this theory has been disproved by Austrians themselves since 1988. In 1990, Germany was reunited but still without Austria.

After Austria's entry into the European Union (EU) in 1995, both are member-states of the EU and have same currency and free border; however whereas Germany is a member nation of NATO from 1955, Austria in accordance with its strict constitutional requirement of neutrality is not a NATO member.

Since 2004, meetings of German-speaking countries have been held annually with six participants, including Germany and Austria.

Country comparison

History
Austria was separated from German Duchy of Bavaria in 972.

Holy Roman Empire

At various times, throughout the Middle and Early-modern Ages, the Holy Roman Empire (HRE) encompassed the bulk of present territories of Germany, Austria, Bohemia (Czech Republic), Slovenia, northern Italy and western Poland. The House of Habsburg became the ruling family of the Empire in 1440; the family would remain so until the dissolution of the Empire in 1806.

Austria has been the Habsburg's seat of power and the dominant state within the realm. The numerous German states (within the HRE) constantly jostled for power and influence; they often warred against each other. In the 18th century, the Kingdom of Prussia rose as another influential power within the HRE; therefore, Prussia became Austria's main rival for dominance over their neighbouring German states. Prussia and Austria fought a series of wars over the province of Silesia (in modern-day southwestern Poland) between 1740 and 1763. Austria and Prussia co-operated in the Partitions of Poland and the Second Schleswig War, which resulted in annexations of Polish and Danish territory.

Napoleonic Wars and German Confederation

The Holy Roman Empire came to an end during the Napoleonic Wars in the 1790s and 1800s, Austria and Prussia allied with each other but fought unsuccessfully against the French Empire. In 1804, Francis II, the Holy Roman Emperor, proclaimed the Austrian Empire, as the remaining German States had become clients of Napoleon's French Empire under the Confederation of the Rhine.

After Napoleon's defeat in 1815, Austria created the German Confederation as a new organisation among the German States, in which Prussia and Austria became reunited. It was during this period that the ideology of Pan-Germanism started to rise. The German Confederation lacked a monarch or a central government with real unifying force. As a result, dualism within the German Confederation laid foundation to the diplomatic tension between Prussia and Austria, who had ambitions to create a unified Germany under their different proposals.

Austria proposed to unite the German states in a union centered on, and dominated by, the Habsburgs; Prussia, however, hoped to become the central forces in unifying the German states and to exclude Austria out of its affairs. In 1834, Prussia succeeded in creating a German Customs Union with northern German states with the hope of political union as its next step. The tension eventually gave rise to the 1866 Austro-Prussian War (Fraternal War of the Germans). Otto von Bismarck, chancellor of Prussia, sided with Italy to surround Austria and bring about the latter's defeat. The Austrian Empire was dissolved into the Dual Monarchy of Austria-Hungary, with the loss of their influence over southern German states (Baden-Württemberg and Bavaria).

German Empire without Austria

In 1867, the new North German Confederation was declared by Bismarck. After Prussia's victory in the Franco-Prussian War in 1870, in which Prussian army entered and marched over Paris, Bismarck announced the creation of the German Empire and excluded Austria-Hungary solely in this unified Germany. Austria-Hungary then turned its imperial ambitions to the Balkan Peninsula; whereas the German Empire focused on building armaments in a race against the United Kingdom (Britain and Ireland). Nevertheless, both the German Empire and Austria-Hungary forged a military alliance with the Kingdom of Italy, forming the Triple Alliance (1882).
In the 1910s, Austria-Hungary's ambition of turning Serbia into its protectorate facilitated the Assassination of Archduke Franz Ferdinand (1914), heir to Austria-Hungary's throne. When Austria-Hungary stirred up excuses for a war (First World War) against Serbia, Germany, claiming the Alliance's terms of passive military defence instead of downright aggression, reluctantly entered the war on Austria-Hungary's side.

Inter-war period

After losing the war, the Habsburgs of Austria-Hungary were overthrown and Kaiser Wilhelm II of Germany abdicated in 1918. Both Germany and Austria became republics and were heavily punished in the Treaty of Versailles (1919) and Treaty of St. Germain-en-Laye (1919). Austria lost over 60% of its pre-war territory (mostly settled by non-ethnic Germans) and was hugely reduced to a rump state, The Republic of German-Austria. The vast majority in both countries wanted unification with Germany (now the Weimar Republic) into a Greater German nation, but this was strictly forbidden by the Treaty of Versailles to avoid a dominant German state.

On 1 September 1920, the Weimar Republic and Austria concluded an economic agreement. Both countries, however, faced severe economic hardships, hyperinflation, mass unemployment and constant riots after the war. After Austrian-born Adolf Hitler came to power in Germany in 1933, he demanded the right to Anschluss (union) between Austria and Germany. This was initially blocked by the Italian Fascist government under Benito Mussolini, who cooperated with his Austrian counterparts Engelbert Dollfuss and Kurt Schuschnigg, fearing retrospective territorial demands from Hitler on Südtirol (South Tyrol) (lost to Italy in 1919). Mussolini successfully forced Hitler to renounce all claims to Austria on 11 July 1936.

Anschluss
 
After 1936, Hitler and Mussolini forged a closer relationship in preparation for Germany's expansionist ambitions. Hitler used the Nazi Party of Austria to influence public opinions and staged a coup against the Austrian Fascist government in 1938. When Hitler decided to refrain from reclaiming South Tyrol, Mussolini abandoned his pledge to protect Austria's independence. Subsequently, the Anschluss of the Third German Reich and Germany-Austria occurred in 1938, reuniting both countries for the first time since the 1870s. Austria became Ostmark (Eastern Region) under Hitler's regime.

Re-Independence

In late April 1945, the Allied Powers entered Austria and removed the country from the Third German Reich. A provisional Austrian government, led by Karl Renner, declared the country's regained independence in the context of after the fall of Third Reich. Austria's democratic constitution was reinstated and elections in late 1945 paved the way for a new federal government. Leopold Figl became the first Chancellor of Austria. Germany, however, was occupied by the Allied Powers and divided into four governing zones: British, French, American and the Soviet. Military occupation of Germany ended in 1949 when such zones were organised into the Federal Republic of Germany (West Germany) and the German Democratic Republic (East Germany).

After the Second World War, there has been no serious effort among the citizens or political parties to unite Germany and Austria. In addition, the Austrian State Treaty forbids such a union and the constitution required Austria's neutrality. A 1987 survey revealed that only 6% of Austrians identified themselves as 'Germans'. Austria began to develop a separate national identity from Germany, although both countries continued to co-operate closely in economic and cultural fields during the Cold War. Moreover, political relations between both countries have been strong and amicable.

In addition to a form of identity in Austria that looked toward Germany, there have also been forms of Austrian identity that rejected reunification of Austria with Germany and German identity on the basis of preserving Austrians' Catholic religious identity from the potential danger posed by being part of a Protestant-majority Germany, as well as their different historical heritage regarding their mainly Celtic (It is location of first Celtic culture and Celts were its first settlers), Slavic, Avar, Rhaethian and Roman origin prior to the colonization of the Germanic Baiuvarii (ancient German Bavarians). In addition; some regions of Austria recognize minority languages as official languages beside German ​​such as Burgenland Croatian, Slovenian, and Hungarian.

European Union

In 1995, Austria joined the European Union and its Schengen Area. This effectively removed the physical land-border between Germany and Austria and allowed both countries to further consolidate their already strong links. In 1999, Germany and Austria became two of the founding members of the Eurozone and adopted Euros as their legal currency in 2001.

Espionage

According to reporting in Der Standard and profil, the Bundesnachrichtendienst engaged in espionage in Austria between 1999 and 2006, spying on targets including the International Atomic Energy Agency, the Organization of the Petroleum Exporting Countries, the Austria Press Agency, embassies, and Austrian banks and government ministries. The government of Austria has called on Germany to clarify the allegations.

Resident diplomatic missions 
 Austria has an embassy in Berlin and a consulate-general in Munich.
 Germany has an embassy in Vienna.

See also
German nationalism in Austria
Pan-Germanism
Austria–NATO relations
European Union–NATO relations

Notes

Further reading

 Katzenstein, Peter J. Disjoined partners : Austria and Germany since 1815 (1976) free to borrow

 
Germany
Bilateral relations of Germany